Palmetto Armory is a national historic site located at 810 6th St., W., Palmetto, Florida in Manatee County.

It was added to the National Register of Historic Places on October 17, 2012.

References

National Register of Historic Places in Manatee County, Florida
Armories on the National Register of Historic Places in Florida